The following lists events that happened during 1976 in the Grand Duchy of Luxembourg.

Incumbents

Events

January – March
 11 March - A law establishing state aid for newspapers is signed into law.

April – June
 3 April – Representing Luxembourg, Juergen Marcus finishes fourteenth in the Eurovision Song Contest 1976 with the song Chansons Pour Ceux Qui S'aiment.

July – September
 21 July - Raymond Vouel resigns as Deputy Prime Minister to take up his position as European Commissioner for Competition.  He is replaced by Bernard Berg.

October – December
 15 December - Georges Thorn is appointed to the Council of State, replacing Norbert Droessaert, who resigned in November.
 18 December – 10,000 public sector workers go on strike.

Births
 4 January – Benoît Joachim, cyclist

Deaths
 18 March – Nicolas Margue, politician
 25 June - Joseph Wolter, member of the Council of State
 10 August - Lambert Schaus, politician and diplomat
 8 December – Albert Borschette, diplomat and writer
 22 December - Paul Weber, member of the Councir of State

Footnotes

References